Dr. Christine Adjobi is an Ivorian politician and physician. She is a member of the Ivorian Popular Front (FPI), and a Minister for the Fight Against AIDS in the Ivorian government of Prime Minister Guillaume Soro.  In 2002–2003, during the Ivorian Civil War, Dr. Adjobi was Delegate Minister in Charge of the Fight Against AIDS. As such, she headed a campaign in the besieged areas, aimed at refugees of war, native peoples, and the national armed forces (FANCI), all of whom, in times of war, run a greater risk of infection with HIV and other sexually transmitted infections. She decided to take into psychosocial and therapeutic care HIV positive people. Thus, successively, she joined the CDC's Retro-CI Project at the Center for Diagnosis and Research on AIDS and other opportunistic infections (CEDRES), in the outpatient unit of the University Hospital Center of Treichville.

Notes

Government ministers of Ivory Coast
Ivorian physicians
Living people
1949 births
Ivorian Popular Front politicians
People from Comoé District
21st-century Ivorian women politicians
21st-century Ivorian politicians
Women government ministers of Ivory Coast
Health ministers of Ivory Coast
Women physicians